The Ilford Manual of Photography is a comprehensive manual of photography, first published in 1890, written by C.H. Bothamley, and published by the Britannia Works Company, which became Ilford, Limited, in 1901. It is still in print, now named The Manual of Photography.

Technical information regarding optics, chemistry and printing are described in far greater depth than in other photographic books, and therefore it quickly became the staple technical book for the professional or serious amateur photographer. It remained so for some time, and with each additional edition further information was added so that it might remain relevant. It still lines the bookshelves of many serious photographers, consequent to its tremendous depth, and the publication of many of the recipes for developers, including the popular ID-11 and IF-2, Ilford Photo's then non-hardening fixer. This represents a tremendous boon for the photographer, and did even more so in the early 20th century, when many would mix their own chemistry. It is comparable in many ways to Ansel Adams' books The Camera, The Negative and The Print, in its logical description of exposing film (and plates), developing the negative, and printing from those negatives.

Editions

Ilford Manual of Photography
 1890: Britannia Works Company, 1st edition
 1942: Ilford, 3rd edition
 1949: Ilford, 4th edition
 1950: Ilford, 4th edition, reprint
 1958: Ilford, 5th edition

The Manual of Photography
 1971: Focal Press, 6th edition
 1978: Focal Press, 7th edition
 1988: Focal Press, 8th edition
 2000: Focal Press, 9th edition
 2011: Focal Press, 10th edition

References

External links
 Ilford Chronology
 Ilford Photo

Photographic collections and books
Photography in the United Kingdom
Handbooks and manuals